Wheeler McIntosh Thackston (born 1944) is an American Orientalist. He has edited and translated numerous Chaghatai, Arabic, and Persian literary and historical works.

Life
Thackston is a graduate of Princeton's Oriental Studies department, where he was a member of Princeton's Colonial Club, and Harvard's Near Eastern Studies department (Ph.D., 1974), where he was Professor of the Practice of Persian and other Near Eastern Languages from 1972. He studied at Princeton under Martin Dickson and at Harvard with Annemarie Schimmel.  Thackston retired from teaching at Harvard in 2007.

His best-known works are Persian and Classical and Qur'anic Arabic grammars and his translations of the Babur-nama, the memoirs of the Mughal prince and emperor Babur, The Gulistan of Saadi, and the memoirs of Emperor Jahangir, or the Jahangir-nama.  He has also produced important manuals or editions of texts in Levantine Arabic, Ottoman Turkish, Syriac, Uzbek, Luri, and Kurdish.

He has also studied Urdu and Sindhi but has not published texts from these languages.

Thackston has retired from his position at the Department of Near Eastern Languages and Civilizations, Harvard University. He currently resides in Cambridge, Massachusetts.

Works
 The History of Akbar, Volume 1 (the Akbarnama), by Abu'l-Fazl ibn Mubarak, edited and translated by Wheeler Thackston, Murty Classical Library of India, Harvard University Press (January 2015), hardcover, 656 pages,

References

External links
 Professor Thackston's Sorani and Kurmanji Kurdish grammars
 
The Emperors' album: images of Mughal India, an exhibition catalog from The Metropolitan Museum of Art (fully available online as PDF), which includes an essay by Thackston

1944 births
American orientalists
Harvard University alumni
Harvard University faculty
Living people
Princeton University alumni